The House of Secrets is a 1929 American mystery film directed by Edmund Lawrence and starring Joseph Striker, Marcia Manning and Elmer Grandin. The screenplay was written by Adeline Leitzbach, based on the 1926 novel of the same name by Sydney Horler. The film is considered lost. It was remade in 1936.

Plot
An American named Barry Wilding travels to England to check out a castle he has inherited there. After hearing of mysterious goings on at the castle, he and his detective friend Joe Blake suspect that a Chinese man named Wu Chang is behind it all.

Cast
 Joseph Striker as Barry Wilding  
 Marcia Manning as Margery Gordon  
 Elmer Grandin as Dr. Gordon  
 Herbert Warren as Detective Joe Blake  
 Francis M. Verdi as Sir Herbert Harcourt  
 Richard Stevenson as Bill  
 Harry Southard as Warton  
 Edward Roseman as Wu Chang  
 Walter Ringham as Home Secretary Forbes

Commentary
Critic Troy Howarth stated "(The film) is a variation on the formula of a mystery surrounding a lavish inheritance....It was apparently an unremarkable mystery thriller with incidental horror elements."

References

Bibliography
 Michael R. Pitts. Poverty Row Studios, 1929-1940: An Illustrated History of 55 Independent Film Companies, with a Filmography for Each. McFarland & Company, 2005.

External links

1929 films
1929 mystery films
American mystery films
Chesterfield Pictures films
Films set in London
American black-and-white films
1929 lost films
Lost mystery films
Films based on British novels
1920s English-language films
1920s American films